Hermance Lesguillon, née Lasdrin (1800 – 29 September 1882) was a 19th-century French poet and novelist. She used the synonyms Madame Hermance and Hermance Sandrin.

She was the wife of Jean-Pierre Lesguillon (1800–1873), and like him, she produced verse and many novels.

She survived her husband by several years and when she died, she bequeathed most of her fortune to the Société des gens de lettres (Society of People of Letters of France).

She is buried with her husband at Père Lachaise Cemetery (49th division).

Works 

1875: Les Adieux
1851: Les Anges de Noël
1863: Aux Grecs d’aujourd’hui
1865: Le Ballon géant, couronné par l’Académie de Dunkerque
 L’Arbre de la liberté (included in Biographie du citoyen Garnier-Pagès, par E. M…)
1855: Contes du cœur
 La Laide (included in Le Conteur)
1877: Les Crèches des petits enfants
1863: Les Deux Destinées.
1846: Les Deux Maintenon
1849: Les Deux Napoléon
 La Vierge de Van Dyck (included in L’écho des feuilletons)
 La Première Communion (included in Émotions)
1866: L’Esprit qui cherche un corps
1880: La Femme d’aujourd’hui, poésies, saynètes in verse and in prose, theatre
1859: Les Femmes dans cent ans
1848: La France à Lamartine
1872: L’Homme, réponse à M. Alexandre Dumas fils
1846: Les Mauvais jours
1842: Le Midi de l’âme
1851: Le Neveu de l’abbé de Saint-Pierre
1845: Le Prêtre au XIXe
1871: Le Prisonnier d’Allemagne, scène à trois personnages
1840: Rayons d’amour
1833: Rêveuse
 Bleu et Blanche (included in Revue des feuilletons)
1843: Rosane
1836: Rosées
 Les Sept vertus, ou Science du bonheur
1867: Un tableau du martyre de saint Laurent, by Emmanuel Théaulon, l’auteur dramatique.
1836: Théâtre moral à l’usage des jeunes personnes
1861: La Tirelire de l’écolier
1875: Les Vraies perles

References 

19th-century French poets
French women poets
Writers from Paris
1800 births
1882 deaths
Burials at Père Lachaise Cemetery
19th-century French women writers
19th-century women writers